Tamphana is a genus of moths of the Bombycidae family.

Species
 Tamphana inferna Dognin, 1916
 Tamphana lojanara Schaus, 1929
 Tamphana maoma Schaus, 1920
 Tamphana marmorea Schaus, 1892
 Tamphana orion Dognin, 1916
 Tamphana praecipua Schaus, 1905

References

 

Bombycidae